Ivana Roščić (born 27 September 1978) is a Croatian actress. She appeared in more than twenty films since 2004.

Selected filmography

References

External links 

1979 births
Living people
Actors from Split, Croatia
Croatian film actresses